The Deutsche JKA-Karate Bund was created 1993 by Hideo Ochi as the German branch of the Japan Karate Association (JKA).

The reason for the founding of the Deutsche JKA-Karate Bund were disagreements with the Deutscher Karate Verband about the importance of the traditional values of Shōtōkan karate.

Today the Deutsche JKA-Karate Bund is an independent and not with the German Olympic Sports Confederation affiliated confederation with more than 21000 members and 450 dojos and clubs.

See also

External links 
 Deutscher JKA-Karate Bund
 Japan Karate Association

References 

Karate organizations
Sports organizations established in 1993
1993 establishments in Germany
Karate in Germany